Gorny Ruchey is a rural locality (a village) in Oshtinskoye Rural Settlement, Vytegorsky District, Vologda Oblast, Russia. The population was 311 as of 2002. There are 6 streets.

Geography 
Gorny Ruchey is located 64 km southwest of Vytegra (the district's administrative centre) by road. Vasyukovskiye Ostrova is the nearest rural locality.

References 

Rural localities in Vytegorsky District